The Supreme Court of Judicature (Ireland) Act 1887 is an Act of the Parliament of the United Kingdom which amended the Supreme Court of Judicature Act (Ireland) 1877. Section 1 abolished the distinction between certain judges of the High Court of Justice in Ireland.  Section 2 transferred a number of powers from other judges to the Lord Chief Justice of Ireland.

United Kingdom Acts of Parliament 1887
Acts of the Parliament of the United Kingdom concerning Ireland
1887 in Ireland